Myrsine mezii, the Hanapepe River colicwood, is a species of tree in the primrose family. It is endemic to the island of Kauai in Hawaii. It is threatened by habitat loss. It is a federally listed endangered species of the United States.

There are two remaining populations of this tree for a total of just five individuals. One of the populations is made up of a single tree which is in poor condition.

References

mezii
Endemic flora of Hawaii
Critically endangered plants
Taxonomy articles created by Polbot